Dheedwal is a town 17 kilometers from Chakwal in Punjab, Pakistan. It has a hospital, a college, a bank, a utility store and some other services like telephone, cable and also water and gas supply.

The mosque of Jamia Masjid Chishtia Ghausia Dheedwal is situated in the center of the village. The community of this mosque belongs to the Muslim sect "Sunni Brailvi".

Dheedwal also hosting another beautiful mosque "Farooqia Masjid" which belongs to Muslim sect "Deobandi Wahabi ". There is a madrassa "Ashabe badr" which is providing quality religious education with the help of community.
Dheedwal got a college, hospital and medical dispensary because of tiring efforts of Ameer Baig Advocate, Sardar Mehr khan (late), both are very popular names and identity of Dheedwal.  Dheedwal got sui gas (natural gas) because of Meg Gen Muammad Saleem Janjua, got electricity because of Shafi khan (late), a good number of Dheedwal people are in the army and police. 
The Tanzim Al-Mustafa Sallah o Alaih e Waalih e Wasalm is an organization of the young men of Dheedwal. The Tanzim organizes the annual Mehfil-e-Naat at the Jamia Masjid Chistia Ghausia Dheedwal. All well known Qura, Naat Khawan and Islamic scholars from different parts of Pakistan come to this Mehfil-e-Pak, which includes thousands of participants. It is the best and the biggest event annually held in Dheedwal.
 
The Village Dheedwal has all the facilities the same as a modern city, for example, a college, hospital, library, landline telephone, water supply system, street lights, and sewerage system, etc.

As you turn from the main road towards the village, you can see a monument (Oblesik). This monument (Oblesik) reflects the participation of these villagers through their army men that fought the 2nd world war. In 2012 this monument was destroyed by land owner on which it was standing.  

Dheedwal has the highest number of graduates and highly educated professionals in District Chakwal. Also, number of military officer from the village prominent one Maj Gen Saleem Janjua, Lt Commander Imam Muhammad raja, Captin (Col) Muhammad Waqar Ahmed, Major Muhammad Waqas Ahmed, from Janjua Family, a number of immigrants from this village settled in Canada and the United States. Historically this village was among the earliest settlements of people along with Ban Ameer Khatoon because of its latitude; and still, in some parts of the area, when construction begins the people witness the unearthing of pieces of utensils showing ancient civilization.

References

GHS Dheedwal is being promoted as Govt. Higher Secondary School Dheedwal.
QPMS is also a private school in the village Dheedwal.

Dheedwal is consisting on Bralvi maslak majority.

Populated places in Chakwal District